Yuremamine is a phytoindole alkaloid which was isolated from the bark of Mimosa tenuiflora in 2005, and erroneously assigned a pyrrolo[1,2-a]indole structure that was thought to represent a new class of indole alkaloids. However, in 2015, the bioinspired total synthesis of yuremamine revealed its structure to be a flavonoid derivative. It was also noted in the original isolation of yuremamine that the alkaloid occurs naturally as a purple solid, but total synthesis revealed that yuremamine as a free base is colorless, and the formation of a trifluoroacetate salt during HPLC purification is what led to the purple appearance.

References

Alkaloids found in Fabaceae
Dimethylamino compounds
Pyrogallols
Secondary alcohols
Tryptamine alkaloids